Sandy McGarry (born November 14, 1961 in Bar Harbor, Maine) is a politician from South Carolina serving in the state House of Representatives.

References 

1961 births
Living people
Republican Party South Carolina state senators
21st-century American politicians